The Diocese of Hamar  is a diocese within the Church of Norway. The Diocese of Hamar includes all of the churches  in Innlandet county plus the churches in Lunner in Viken county. Administratively, the diocese is divided into 10 deaneries and 164 parishes in the diocese. The seat of the Diocese of Hamar is located at the Hamar Cathedral in the city of Hamar.

History
The Roman Catholic Diocese of Hamar was formed in the year 1152 when it was separated from the Roman Catholic Diocese of Christiania. At the time of the Protestant Reformation in Norway in 1536, the archbishop and the bishops were removed and the Diocese of Hamar once again came under the Diocese of Christiania within the new Lutheran Church of Norway. Mogens Lauritsson was the last Roman Catholic bishop of the Ancient Diocese of Hamar. 

In 1864, the Lutheran Diocese of Hamar was established when it was separated from the Diocese of Christiania. Halvor Olsen Folkestad was the first bishop of this new Diocese of Hamar. Hamar Cathedral was consecrated on 15 December 1866 and it was established as the seat of the new Diocese of Hamar. On 1 January 2022, the churches in Jevnaker municipality were transferred to the Ringsaker prosti in the Diocese of Tunsberg.

Structure
The Diocese of Hamar is divided into ten deaneries spread out over Innlandet and Viken counties.  Each deanery corresponds a geographical area, usually one or more municipalities within the diocese. Each municipality is further divided into one or more parishes which each contain one or more congregations.

List of bishops
The following bishops have led the diocese since its creation in 1864:
1864–1887: Halvor Olsen Folkestad
1887–1906: Arnoldus Hille
1906–1917: Christen Brun
1917–1918: Otto Jensen
1918–1922: Gustav Johan Fredrik Dietrichson
1922–1934: Mikkel Bjønness-Jacobsen
1934–1942: Henrik Hille
1942–1943: Georg Falck-Hansen (appointed by Nasjonal Samling)
1943–1945: Sigurd Haga (appointed by Nasjonal Samling)
1945–1947: Henrik Hille
1947–1964: Kristian Schjelderup
1964–1974: Alexander Johnson
1974–1993: Georg Hille
1993–2006: Rosemarie Köhn
2006–present: Solveig Fiske

References

External links
Hamar bispedømme Norges Kirker

 
Organisations based in Hamar
Hamar
Religious organizations established in 1864
1864 establishments in Norway